Billbergia lymanii is a plant species in the genus Billbergia. This species is endemic to Brazil.

References

lymanii
Endemic flora of Brazil
Flora of the Atlantic Forest